Ceromidae is a family of solifuges, first described by Carl Friedrich Roewer in 1933.

Genera
, the World Solifugae Catalog accepts the following four genera:
Ceroma Karsch, 1885
Ceromella Roewer, 1933
Toreus Purcell, 1903
†Cratosolpuga Selden, 1996

References

Solifugae
Arachnid families